Lucas Lira Soares (born 16 April 1994) is a Brazilian youtuber, entrepreneur and digital influencer, known for the vlogs of the channel Invento na Hora on YouTube, where he shows his day-to-day life with humor alongside his partner and child. Lira was born in Brasilia, Brazil. He is the creator of the YouTube channel Invento na Hora. It is one of the top 100 on YouTube Brazil. After high school, Lira studied web design. He also worked as a photo editor, clerk and lottery assistant. After this, he decided to create the channel Invento na Hora on YouTube .

Career 
Lira began posting videos on YouTube in 2012. He wanted to express his opinions on many subjects in 2010 but did not have a camera for recordings until 2012. The name Invento na Hora came from the fact that he did not plan any scripts for the videos. It translates as "I invent on the spot". Glasses, bandanas and caps were part of the channel's early identity, though he later stopped using them.

In 2014, Lucas Lira was a part of the Phenomenon of the Internet, a segment on the  program on SBT. One of his 2013 videos had gone viral on the web. He did not win the competition but was ranked first in Twitter's Trending Topics. This gave Invento na Hora more visibility. In November 2014, Lucas Lira reached 1 million subscribers.

Because of his recognition as a youtuber, he has participated in other television programs. These include Legendários, Programa Raul Gil and Domingo Legal . In 2016, he wrote the book Minha Vida Antes do Invento na Hora. It mainly tells stories from when he was younger. In the same year, he was the winner of Entubados. It is a reality show for youtubers on the Sony channel.

As of April 2022, the Invento Na Hora channel has more than 14 million subscribers. Lira also has almost 6 million Instagram followers and over 3 million Twitter followers .

Personal life 
Lira has been dating youtuber Sunaika Bruna de Souza since 2014, becoming engaged to be married in 2020. They have been in several videos together since when they started dating. On 5 July 2020, it was announced that the two were expecting their first child. Their son, Noah de Souza Lira Soares, was born in February 2021.

In 2015, Lucas left his parents' house and moved to São Paulo, living there for 6 years. In 2021, he returned to live in Brasília.

Filmography

Television

Internet

Video clips

Books

Awards and Nominations

References

External links 
 
 

1994 births
Living people
Brazilian entertainers
Brazilian YouTubers